The President of the National Assembly of the Lao People's Democratic Republic is the speaker of the National Assembly of Laos. Before 1991, the President of the Standing Committee of the Supreme People's Assembly of the Lao People's Democratic Republic served as head of state and chairman of the presidium of the National Assembly's predecessor, the Supreme People's Assembly. The office was later merged with that of parliamentary president while the head of state became the President of Laos.

Presidents of the Standing Committee of the Supreme People's Assembly

Presidents of the National Assembly

See also
National Assembly (Laos)
Parliament of the Kingdom of Laos

References

Politics of Laos
Laos, National Assembly